Albert Jud (born 24 January 1912) was a Swiss sprinter. He competed in the men's 400 metres at the 1936 Summer Olympics.

Competition record

References

External links
 

1912 births
Year of death missing
Athletes (track and field) at the 1936 Summer Olympics
Swiss male sprinters
Olympic athletes of Switzerland
Place of birth missing